The 2006 Guangzhou International Women's Open was a tennis tournament played on outdoor hard courts. It was the 3rd edition of the Guangzhou International Women's Open, and was a Tier III event on the 2006 Sony Ericsson WTA Tour. It was held in Guangzhou, China, from September 25 through October 1, 2006. Total prize money for the tournament was $175,000. Anna Chakvetadze won the singles title.

Singles main-draw entrants

Seeds 

 1 Seeds are based on the rankings of September 18, 2006.

Other entrants 
The following players received wildcards into the singles main draw
  Chen Yanchong
  Li Ting
  Zhang Shuai

The following players received entry from the singles qualifying draw:
  Hao Jie
  Ren Jing
  Sun Shengnan
  Elise Tamaëla

Finals

Singles 
 Anna Chakvetadze defeated  Anabel Medina Garrigues, 6–1, 6–4
Chakvetadze won the first WTA title of her career.

Doubles 

 Li Ting /  Sun Tiantian defeated  Vania King /  Jelena Kostanić, 6–4, 2–6, 7–5

Prize money and points breakdown

Singles

Doubles

References

External links
Official website
2006 Results on the ITF
  2006 Luxembourg, Guangzhou & Seoul WTA Results     A Bondarenko, A Chakvetadze, & E Daniilidou, Champions

Guangzhou International Women's Open
2006
Guangzhou International Women's Open, 2006